Edgar Alexei Robert von  Wahl or  de Wahl (23 August 1867 – 9 March 1948) was a Baltic German teacher, mathematician and linguist. He is most famous for being the creator of Interlingue (known as Occidental throughout his life), a naturalistic constructed language based on the Indo-European languages, which was initially published in 1922.

De Wahl was born in Olwiopol (according to some sources in Bohopil, a town nearby), Kherson Governorate, Russian Empire (now part of Pervomaisk, Mykolaiv Oblast, Ukraine). The family spent several years in Ukraine, since de Wahl's father worked there as a railway engineer. After that the family stayed for several years in Tallinn and then moved to Saint Petersburg. Wahl studied there and then began service in the Imperial Russian Navy. Beginning in 1894, de Wahl worked as a teacher in Tallinn.

De Wahl first became an adherent of Volapük after being introduced to the language by Waldemar Rosenberger (a colleague of de Wahl's father), and began composing a lexicon for marine terminology. A few months later in 1888 he discovered a brochure on the language Esperanto in a bookshop and became a strong supporter of the new language. One of the first users of Esperanto, he advised L. L. Zamenhof on some points of grammar and vocabulary. After several years he abandoned Esperanto after the failed vote to reform the language in 1894 (de Wahl was one of the few that voted for a completely new reform), and in the following decades he worked on the problem of the ideal form of an international auxiliary language.

In 1922 de Wahl published a "key" to a new language, Occidental, and the first number of a periodical entitled Kosmoglott (later Cosmoglotta), written in that language. In following years, de Wahl participated in discussions about Occidental, and allowed the language to develop gradually as a result of the  recommendations of its users. After World War II started in 1939, he had only intermittent contacts with the Occidentalist movement, which had become centred in Switzerland. He became a member of the Committee of Linguistic Advisors, part of the International Auxiliary Language Association, which would present Interlingua in 1951.

The last years of de Wahl's life were spent in a psychiatric hospital in Tallinn, Estonia, which he was sent to in 1944. His home in Tallinn had been destroyed in aerial bombardments in 1943, and he had been incarcerated for a time after the arrival of Nazi troops in the city for refusing to move to Germany as an ethnic German, and thereafter saved by his friends who argued for his mental instability and need to relocate to the hospital. With his home destroyed, he remained in the psychiatric hospital after the war and died there in 1948. Shortly afterwards, in 1949, the name of Occidental was changed to Interlingue. Later, in 1951, Interlingua was unveiled, attracting many prominent users of the now-named Interlingue including Ric Berger and André Schild.

See also
De Wahl's rule

Publications
Edgar von Wahl. Flexion und Begriffsspaltung. – Linguist 1896, nr 10.
Edgar von Wahl. Ausnahmen. – Linguist 1897, nr 3.
Edgar de Wahl. [Idiom neutral reformed]. – Progres 1906, nr 6.
Julian Prorók. Ketzereien: Keimzellen einer Philosophie. Tartu, Leipzig 1906.
Edgar de Wahl. AULI = Auxiliari lingue International. – Discussiones 1909, nr 1-2.
Edgar de Wahl. L leges de derivation en verbes. – Lingua Internationale 1911, nr 1.
Edgar von Wahl. Kaiserlicher Estländischer See-Yacht-Club: historische Übersicht 1888-1913. Tallinn 1913.
Edgar de Wahl. Qual instructiones da nos li historie de lingue universal. – Kosmoglott 1922, nr 1, pp 6–8. 
Edgar de Wahl. Radicarium directiv del lingue international (occidental): in 8 lingues. Tallinn 1925.
Edgar de Wahl. Interlinguistic reminiscenties. – Cosmoglotta 1927, nr 41, pp 54–64.
Edgar de Wahl. Occidental: gemeinverständliche europäische Kultursprache für internationalen Verkehr: Begründung, Grammatik, Wortbildung, vergleichende textproben. Tallinn, Viin 1928.
Edgar de Wahl, Otto Jespersen. Discussiones inter E. de Wahl e O. Jespersen. Chapelle 1935.
Edgar de Wahl. Spiritu de interlingue. Cheseaux/Lausanne, 1953.

References

1867 births
1948 deaths
People from Pervomaisk, Mykolaiv Oblast
People from Yelisavetgradsky Uyezd
Baltic-German people
Linguists from Estonia
Estonian scholars
Constructed language creators
Interlingue
Interlingue speakers